Robbers of the Range is a 1941 American Western film directed by Edward Killy and starring Tim Holt, Virginia Vale, Ray Whitley, and Emmett Lynn.

It was the third in Tim Holt's series of Westerns for RKO. Holt fractured two bones in his foot in an accident during filming.

Plot
A railroad agent goes to diabolical lengths to wrest land from a stubborn rancher. The rancher is falsely accused of murder.

Cast

References

External links
 
 
 
 

1941 films
1941 Western (genre) films
American Western (genre) films
RKO Pictures films
Films directed by Edward Killy
Films produced by Bert Gilroy
American black-and-white films
Films scored by Paul Sawtell
1940s American films